Deh-e Sheykh (also Romanized as Deh Shaikh; also known as Deh Sheikh Hoomeh Zarand) is a village in Mohammadabad Rural District, in the Central District of Zarand County, Kerman Province, Iran. At the 2006 census, its population was 275, in 63 families.

References 

Populated places in Zarand County